Matteo Barbini (born 25 January 1991) is an Italian professional footballer who plays as a midfielder for Seconda Divisione club Sacilese, on loan from Milan.

Club career

Early career 
Born in Venice, Barbini started playing football with local team Sesto Bagnarola at the age of 5, before joining Sanvitese at the age of 10 and then moving to Treviso at the age of 15. In August 2009, aged 18, he was signed by Serie A club Milan and spent one season in the club's youth system.

Sacilese 
At the beginning of the 2010–11 season, Barbini was sent out on loan to Seconda Divisione club Sacilese. He made his official debut for the club on 22 August 2010, in a Coppa Italia Lega Pro group stage game against Sambonifacese, playing the whole 90 minutes, as Sacilese suffered a 3–0 defeat. A month later, on 26 September, he also made his league debut, coming on in the 80th minute of a 1–0 away loss against Casale.

References

External links 
 Profile at Assocalciatori.it 

Living people
1991 births
Footballers from Venice
Association football midfielders
Italian footballers
Serie C players
Treviso F.B.C. 1993 players
A.C. Milan players